A Thousand Little Things is the fifteenth album and ninth studio album by Christian group Point of Grace. It was released on May 1, 2012.

Track listing
"Good Enough" (Shelley Breen, Leigh Cappillino, Denise Jones, Steven Dale Jones, Cindy Morgan) - 3:03
"Heaven Knows" (Ben Glover, Tim James) - 3:19
"A Thousand Little Things" (Breen, Cappillino, Jones, Ian Eskelin, Tony Wood) - 2:41
"Only Jesus" (Christa Wells, Nicole Witt) - 3:49
"What I Already Know" (Scotty Alexander, Michael Boggs, Bryan White) - 3:52
"Might Be Today" (Breen, Cappillino, Jones, Connie Harrington, Jill Paquette) – 3:13
"Wash Me Away" (Ian Eskelin, Nicole Witt, Tony Wood) - 3:03
"You Be The One" (Cindy Morgan, Nicole Witt) - 4:05
"I Believe In You" (Dedication Song) (Cindy Morgan, Laurie Smith) - 4:10
"Saving Jesus" (Chad Cates, Jeffrey East, Tony Wood) - 3:33

Personnel 

Point of Grace
 Shelley Breen – vocals
 Denise Jones – vocals
 Leigh Cappillino – vocals

Musicians
 Tim Lauer – keyboards, organ, string arrangements
 Michael Boggs – acoustic guitar
 Brandon Hood – acoustic guitar, banjo, mandolin
 Bryan Sutton – acoustic guitar, banjo, mandolin
 Mike Payne – electric guitars
 Tony Lucido – bass guitar 
 Ben Phillips – drums
 Eric Darken – percussion
 John Catchings – cello
 Kris Wilkinson – viola
 David Angell – violin
 David Davidson – violin
 Craig Nelson – upright bass

Production 
 Ian Eskelin – producer 
 Marc Lacuesta – vocal producer, vocal recording, string recording 
 Jason Jenkins – A&R
 Susan Riley – A&R 
 Aaron Shannon – engineer 
 Ainslie Grosser – mixing 
 Andrew Mendelson – mastering at Georgetown Masters (Nashville, Tennessee).
 Shawn Williams – music copyist 
 Jamie Kiner – production coordinator 
 Shane Tarleton – creative director
 Katherine Petillo – art direction
 Sally Carnes Gulde – design 
 Kristin Barlowe – photography 
 David Kaufman – wardrobe 
 Megan Thompson – hair stylist, makeup

References

2012 albums
Point of Grace albums
Word Records albums